Colin Lever (born 4 August 1939) is a former English cricketer.  Lever was a right-handed batsman who bowled right-arm medium pace.  He was born in Todmorden, Yorkshire.

Lever made his debut for Buckinghamshire in the 1962 Minor Counties Championship against Oxfordshire.  He played Minor counties cricket for Buckinghamshire from 1962 to 1978, which included 91 Minor Counties Championship matches.  In 1965, he made his List A debut against Middlesex in the Gillette Cup.  He played seven further List A matches for Buckinghamshire, the last coming against Middlesex in the 1975 Gillette Cup.  In these eight matches, he scored 69 runs at a batting average of 11.50, with a high score of 20.  With the ball he took 7 wickets at a bowling average of 43.00, with best figures of 3/19.

During his career, Lever made a single first-class appearance for a combined Minor Counties cricket team against the touring South Africans in 1965 at Osborne Avenue, Jesmond.  In this match he took 3 wickets in the South Africans first-innings, those of Graeme Pollock, Colin Bland and Norman Crookes.  In the Minor Counties first-innings he was dismissed for 12 by Jackie Botten, before taking a further South African wicket in their second-innings.  In the Minor Counties second-innings scored 8 runs before being dismissed by off spinner Norman Crookes.

He played as the professional for Heywood in the Central Lancashire League for nine consecutive seasons from 1968 to 1976, leading Heywood to the championship three times.

Lever then moved to play in the Liverpool and District Cricket Competition and, after a spell with Liverpool CC, joined the Northern Cricket Club in 1979. Over the next ten seasons he hit 4 first team centuries and took 7 or more wickets in an innings on 7 occasions. He captained the club for three seasons from 1980 to 1982. Most notably he celebrated his 40th birthday by scoring an undefeated 104 and taking 7 wickets for 28 runs against neighbours Bootle on 4 August 1979. In 1992 in a second team fixture, he took 7 wickets for 56 at the age of 53..

He is the brother of Peter Lever, who played Test and One Day International cricket for England.

References

External links
Colin Lever at ESPNcricinfo
Colin Lever at CricketArchive

1939 births
Living people
People from Todmorden
English cricketers
Buckinghamshire cricketers
Minor Counties cricketers
Sportspeople from Yorkshire